Richard Kogan (born 1941) is an American businessman. He served as the president and chief executive officer of Schering-Plough from 1996 to 2003, and its chairman from 1998 to 2002.

Biography

Early life
He was born in 1941 in New York City. He graduated from the City College of New York and received an M.B.A. from the New York University Stern School of Business.

Career
He joined Schering-Plough as executive vice president for pharmaceutical operations in 1982. In 1986, he became president and chief operating officer. From 1996 to 2003, he served as president and CEO, and from 1998 to 2002 as chairman of the board. 

He has served on the board of directors of Colgate-Palmolive and The Bank of New York Mellon. He also sits on the boards of trustees of the Saint Barnabas Medical Center and New York University, where he also sits on the board of overseers of the Stern School of Business. He is a member of the Council on Foreign Relations.

References

Living people
1941 births
Businesspeople from New York City
City College of New York alumni
New York University Stern School of Business alumni
Schering-Plough
Colgate-Palmolive